Rachel Andrew is a British web developer, author and speaker. She is an Invited Expert to the World Wide Web Consortium (W3C) CSS Working Group, Google Developer Expert, and a former member of the Web Standards Project. She is the editor-in-chief of Smashing Magazine.

Education 
Andrew took online courses at Open University.

Career 
Andrew began working as a web developer in 1996 at a .com company that folded during the Dot-com bubble burst. She said that she became self-employed afterward because it was more stable. 

In 2001, she founded edgeofmyseat.com, the web development company behind Perch CMS, a content management system, and Notist, an application for building public speaking portfolios.

Andrew is a Technical Writer at Google, and works on MDN Web Docs on behalf of Google and Mozilla.

Andrew has authored or co-authored more than twenty books about web development. She is also a regular contributor to A List Apart, and speaker (notably at An Event Apart).

Books 
 Rachel Andrew. The New CSS Layout. A Book Apart. Published:Oct 10, 2017. 
 Jeremy Keith, Rachel Andrew. HTML5 for Web Designers. A Book Apart. Published:First Ed. May 4, 2010; Second Ed. Feb 17, 2016. 
 Rachel Andrew. Get Ready For CSS Grid Layout. A Book Apart. Published:Jan 7, 2016. 
 Rachel Andrew. The Profitable Side Project Handbook. Publication date: January 2014. Author website.
 Rachel Andrew. CSS3 Layout Modules. Publication date: August 2014. Author website.
 Harry Roberts, Nicholas C. Zakas, Christian Heilmann, Tim Kadlec, Mat Marquis, Addy Osmani, Aaron Gustafson, Paul Tero, Rachel Andrew, Nishant Kothary, Christopher Murphy. Perspectives on Web Design. Publication date: November 2013. ISBN (PDF): 978-3-94454060-3. ISBN (EPUB): 978-3-94454058-0. ISBN (KINDLE): 978-3-94454059-7. ISBN (Print): 978-3-94454057-3
 Rachel Andrew. The CSS3 Anthology (4th Edition). SitePoint Pty Ltd. Publication date: March 2012
 Elliot Jay Stocks, Paul Boag, Rachel Andrew, Ben Schwarz, Lea Verou, David Storey, Christian Heilmann, Dmitry Fadeyev, Marc Edwards, Aaron Walter,  Aral Balkan, Stephen Hay, Andy Clarke. The Smashing Book 3 - Redesign the Web. Published by Smashing Magazine. Publication date: May 2012
 Rachel Andrew. The CSS Anthology (3rd Edition). SitePoint Pty Ltd. Publication date: August 2009
 Rachel Andrew, Kevin Yank. Everything You Know About CSS is Wrong. SitePoint Pty Ltd. Publication date: October 2008
 Rachel Andrew, Dan Shafer. HTML Utopia: Designing Without Tables Using CSS (2nd Edition). SitePoint Pty Ltd. Publication date: April 2006
 Rachel Andrew. Build Your Own Standards Compliant Website Using Dreamweaver 8. SitePoint Pty Ltd. Publication date: September 2005
 Rachel Andrew. The CSS Anthology: 101 Essential Tips, Tricks & Hacks (2nd Edition). SitePoint Pty Ltd. Publication date: August 2007
 Rachel Andrew. The CSS Anthology: 101 Essential Tips, Tricks & Hacks (1st Edition). SitePoint Pty Ltd. Publication date: August 2004
 Costas Hadjisotiriou, Kevin Marshall, Rachel Andrew. ASP.NET Web Development with Macromedia Dreamweaver MX 2004. Apress. Publication date: April 2004
 Rachel Andrew, Rob Turnbull, Alan Foley, Drew McLellan. ASP Web Development with Macromedia Dreamweaver MX 2004. Apress. Publication date: February 2004
 Rachel Andrew, Allan Kent, David Powers. PHP Web Development with Macromedia Dreamweaver MX 2004. Apress. Publication date: July 2004
 Rachel Andrew, Craig Grannell, Allan Kent, Christopher Schmitt. Dreamweaver MX 2004 Design Projects. Friends of Ed (Publisher). Publication date: October 2004
 Rachel Andrew, Gareth Downes-Powell, Nancy Gill, Kevin Marshall, Drew McLellan. The Dreamweaver Developer’s Instant Troubleshooter. Apress. Publication date: July 2003
 Rachel Andrew, Christopher Schmitt, Allan Kent, Craig Grannell. Dreamweaver MX Design Projects. Glasshaus (Publisher). Publication date: January 2003
 Rachel Andrew, Crystal Waters, Chris Ullman. Fundamental Web Design and Development Skills. Glasshaus (Publisher). Publication date: September 2003
 Rachel Andrew, Alan Foley, Omar Elbaga, Rob Turnbull, Bob Regan. Dynamic Dreamweaver MX. Glasshaus (Publisher). Publication date: July 2002

Personal life 
Andrew left school at age 16, reporting that her General Certificates of Secondary Education (GCSEs) were "dreadful". She originally trained to be a dancer and choreographer, and worked backstage in the theatre as a carpenter. At age 22, Andrew became pregnant and started freelancing as a typist, processing documents like Curriculum Vitaes (CVs).

During her time as a typist, Andrew spent time on internet forums to connect with other parents, and learned HTML from the other participants. She later taught herself other programming languages and started working as a web developer.

Andrew lives in Bristol, United Kingdom and has a daughter.

References

Year of birth missing (living people)
Living people
Web developers